The 1999 Alabama Crimson Tide baseball team is a baseball team that represented the University of Alabama in the 1999 NCAA Division I baseball season. The Crimson Tide were members of the Southeastern Conference and played their home games at Sewell–Thomas Stadium in Tuscaloosa, Alabama. They were led by fifth-year head coach Jim Wells.

Roster

Schedule 

! style="" | Regular Season: 42–14
|- valign="top" 

|- align="center" bgcolor="#ddffdd"
| 1 || February 12 || at  || No. 10 || Schroeder Park • Houston, Texas || W 5–1 || 1–0 || –
|- align="center" bgcolor="#ffdddd"
| 2 || February 13 || at Houston || No. 10 || Schroeder Park • Houston, Texas || L 5–9 || 1–1 || –
|- align="center" bgcolor="#ffdddd"
| 3 || February 14 || at Houston || No. 10 || Schroeder Park • Houston, Texas || L 2–6 || 1–2 || –
|- align="center" bgcolor="#ddffdd"
| 4 || February 18 ||  || No. 18 || Sewell–Thomas Stadium • Tuscaloosa, Alabama || W 3–1 || 2–2 || –
|- align="center" bgcolor="#ddffdd"
| 5 || February 19 ||  || No. 18 || Sewell–Thomas Stadium • Tuscaloosa, Alabama || W 3–2 || 3–2 || –
|- align="center" bgcolor="#ffdddd"
| 6 || February 20 || Arkansas State || No. 18 || Sewell–Thomas Stadium • Tuscaloosa, Alabama || L 4–8 || 3–3 || –
|- align="center" bgcolor="#ddffdd"
| 7 || February 21 || Arkansas State || No. 18 || Sewell–Thomas Stadium • Tuscaloosa, Alabama || W 13–5 || 4–3 || –
|- align="center" bgcolor="#ddffdd"
| 8 || February 24 ||  || No. 22 || Sewell–Thomas Stadium • Tuscaloosa, Alabama || W 4–2 || 5–3 || –
|- align="center" bgcolor="#ddffdd"
| 9 || February 24 || Troy || No. 22 || Sewell–Thomas Stadium • Tuscaloosa, Alabama  || W 5–4 || 6–3 || –
|- align="center" bgcolor="#ffdddd"
| 10 || February 26 || No. 10  || No. 22 || Sewell–Thomas Stadium • Tuscaloosa, Alabama || L 2–5 || 6–4 || –
|- align="center" bgcolor="#ddffdd"
| 11 || February 27 || No. 10 Cal State Fullerton || No. 22 || Sewell–Thomas Stadium • Tuscaloosa, Alabama || W 5–4 || 7–4 || –
|- align="center" bgcolor="#ddffdd"
| 12 || February 28 || No. 10 Cal State Fullerton || No. 22 || Sewell–Thomas Stadium • Tuscaloosa, Alabama || W 7–6 || 8–4 || –
|-

|- align="center" bgcolor="#ddffdd"
| 13 || March 2 ||  || No. 15 || Sewell–Thomas Stadium • Tuscaloosa, Alabama || W 6–3 || 9–4 || –
|- align="center" bgcolor="#ddffdd"
| 14 || March 5 ||  || No. 15 || Sewell–Thomas Stadium • Tuscaloosa, Alabama || W 14–3 || 10–4 || –
|- align="center" bgcolor="#ddffdd"
| 15 || March 6 || Niagara || No. 15 || Sewell–Thomas Stadium • Tuscaloosa, Alabama || W 19–2 || 11–4 || –
|- align="center" bgcolor="#ddffdd"
| 16 || March 7 || Niagara || No. 15 || Sewell–Thomas Stadium • Tuscaloosa, Alabama || W 27–0 || 12–4 || –
|- align="center" bgcolor="#ddffdd"
| 17 || March 9 ||  || No. 14 || Sewell–Thomas Stadium • Tuscaloosa, Alabama || W 5–3 || 13–4 || –
|- align="center" bgcolor="#ddffdd"
| 18 || March 12 || at  || No. 14 || Lindsey Nelson Stadium • Knoxville, Tennessee || W 12–7 || 14–4 || 1–0
|- align="center" bgcolor="#ddffdd"
| 19 || March 14 || at Tennessee || No. 14 || Lindsey Nelson Stadium • Knoxville, Tennessee || W 12–5 || 15–4 || 2–0
|- align="center" bgcolor="#ffdddd"
| 20 || March 14 || at Tennessee || No. 14 || Lindsey Nelson Stadium • Knoxville, Tennessee || L 9–21 || 15–5 || 2–1
|- align="center" bgcolor="#ddffdd"
| 21 || March 16 ||  || No. 15 || Sewell–Thomas Stadium • Tuscaloosa, Alabama || W 4–2 || 16–5 || –
|- align="center" bgcolor="#ddffdd"
| 22 || March 19 ||  || No. 15 || Sewell–Thomas Stadium • Tuscaloosa, Alabama || W 8–2 || 17–5 || 3–1
|- align="center" bgcolor="#ddffdd"
| 23 || March 20 || Georgia || No. 15 || Sewell–Thomas Stadium • Tuscaloosa, Alabama || W 4–2 || 18–5 || 4–1
|- align="center" bgcolor="#ddffdd"
| 24 || March 21 || Georgia || No. 15 || Sewell–Thomas Stadium • Tuscaloosa, Alabama || W 9–8 || 19–5 || 5–1
|- align="center" bgcolor="#ddffdd"
| 25 || March 23 ||  || No. 12 || Sewell–Thomas Stadium • Tuscaloosa, Alabama || W 27–5 || 20–5 || –
|- align="center" bgcolor="#ddffdd"
| 26 || March 24 || Kansas State || No. 12 || Sewell–Thomas Stadium • Tuscaloosa, Alabama || W 9–8 || 21–5 || –
|- align="center" bgcolor="#ffdddd"
| 27 || March 26 || at No. 2  || No. 12 || Plainsman Park • Auburn, Alabama || L 4–15 || 21–6 || 5–2
|- align="center" bgcolor="#ffdddd"
| 28 || March 27 || at No. 2 Auburn || No. 12 || Plainsman Park • Auburn, Alabama || L 2–10 || 21–7 || 5–3
|- align="center" bgcolor="#ddffdd"
| 29 || March 28 || at No. 2 Auburn || No. 12 || Plainsman Park • Auburn, Alabama || W 10–4 || 22–7 || 6–3
|- align="center" bgcolor="#ffdddd"
| 30 || March 30 || at  || No. 15 || Rudy Abbott Field • Jacksonville, Alabama || L 3–5 || 22–8 || –
|- align="center" bgcolor="#ddffdd"
| 31 || March 31 || Jacksonville State || No. 15 || Sewell–Thomas Stadium • Tuscaloosa, Alabama || W 3–0 || 23–8 || –
|-

|- align="center" bgcolor="#ddffdd"
| 32 || April 2 || No. 26  || No. 15 || Sewell–Thomas Stadium • Tuscaloosa, Alabama || W 13–8 || 24–8 || 7–3
|- align="center" bgcolor="#ddffdd"
| 33 || April 3 || No. 26 South Carolina || No. 15 || Sewell–Thomas Stadium • Tuscaloosa, Alabama || W 14–5 || 25–8 || 8–3
|- align="center" bgcolor="#ffdddd"
| 34 || April 4 || No. 26 South Carolina || No. 15 || Sewell–Thomas Stadium • Tuscaloosa, Alabama || L 4–12 || 25–9 || 8–4
|- align="center" bgcolor="#ddffdd"
| 35 || April 7 ||  || No. 16 || Sewell–Thomas Stadium • Tuscaloosa, Alabama || W 8–6 || 26–9 || –
|- align="center" bgcolor="#ddffdd"
| 36 || April 9 || at No. 7  || No. 16 || Dudy Noble Field, Polk–DeMent Stadium • Starkville, Mississippi || W 6–4 || 27–9 || 9–4
|- align="center" bgcolor="#ffdddd"
| 37 || April 10 || at No. 7 Mississippi State || No. 16 || Dudy Noble Field, Polk–DeMent Stadium • Starkville, Mississippi || L 4–5 || 27–10 || 9–5
|- align="center" bgcolor="#ffdddd"
| 38 || April 11 || at No. 7 Mississippi State || No. 18 || Dudy Noble Field, Polk–DeMent Stadium • Starkville, Mississippi || L 9–10 || 27–11 || 9–6
|- align="center" bgcolor="#ddffdd"
| 39 || April 14 || at  || No. 18 || Jerry D. Young Memorial Field • Birmingham, Alabama || W 30–4 || 28–11 || 9–6
|- align="center" bgcolor="#ddffdd"
| 40 || April 16 ||  || No. 18 || Sewell–Thomas Stadium • Tuscaloosa, Alabama || W 10–3 || 29–11 || 10–6
|- align="center" bgcolor="#ffdddd"
| 41 || April 17 || LSU || No. 18 || Sewell–Thomas Stadium • Tuscaloosa, Alabama || L 8–9 || 29–12 || 10–7
|- align="center" bgcolor="#ddffdd"
| 42 || April 18 || LSU || No. 18 || Sewell–Thomas Stadium • Tuscaloosa, Alabama || W 9–4 || 30–12 || 11–7
|- align="center" bgcolor="#ddffdd"
| 43 || April 20 ||  || No. 18 || Sewell–Thomas Stadium • Tuscaloosa, Alabama || W 7–6 || 31–12 || –
|- align="center" bgcolor="#ddffdd"
| 44 || April 23 || No. 10  || No. 18 || Sewell–Thomas Stadium • Tuscaloosa, Alabama || W 8–3 || 32–12 || 12–7
|- align="center" bgcolor="#ddffdd"
| 45 || April 24 || No. 10 Arkansas || No. 18 || Sewell–Thomas Stadium • Tuscaloosa, Alabama || W 15–8 || 33–12 || 13–7
|- align="center" bgcolor="#ddffdd"
| 46 || April 25 || No. 10 Arkansas || No. 18 || Sewell–Thomas Stadium • Tuscaloosa, Alabama || W 9–8 || 34–12 || 14–7
|- align="center" bgcolor="#ddffdd"
| 47 || April 28 || UAB || No. 12 || Sewell–Thomas Stadium • Tuscaloosa, Alabama || W 22–5 || 35–12 || –
|- align="center" bgcolor="#ffdddd"
| 48 || April 30 || at No. 26  || No. 12 || Swayze Field • Oxford, Mississippi || L 2–6 || 35–13 || 14–8
|-

|- align="center" bgcolor="#ddffdd"
| 49 || May 1 || at No. 26 Ole Miss || No. 12 || Swayze Field • Oxford, Mississippi || W 8–4 || 36–13 || 15–8
|- align="center" bgcolor="#ffdddd"
| 50 || May 2 || at No. 26 Ole Miss || No. 12 || Swayze Field • Oxford, Mississippi || L 3–10 || 36–14 || 15–9
|- align="center" bgcolor="#ddffdd"
| 51 || May 7 ||  || No. 12 || Sewell–Thomas Stadium • Tuscaloosa, Alabama || W 3–2 || 37–14 || 16–9
|- align="center" bgcolor="#ddffdd"
| 52 || May 8 || Vanderbilt || No. 12 || Sewell–Thomas Stadium • Tuscaloosa, Alabama || W 22–13 || 38–14 || 17–9
|- align="center" bgcolor="#ddffdd"
| 53 || May 9 || Vanderbilt || No. 12 || Sewell–Thomas Stadium • Tuscaloosa, Alabama || W 14–5 || 39–14 || 18–9
|- align="center" bgcolor="#ddffdd"
| 54 || May 14 || at Florida || No. 12 || Alfred A. McKethan Stadium • Gainesville, Florida || W 12–10 || 40–14 || 19–9
|- align="center" bgcolor="#ddffdd"
| 55 || May 15 || at Florida || No. 12 || Alfred A. McKethan Stadium • Gainesville, Florida || W 4–3 || 41–14 || 20–9
|- align="center" bgcolor="#ddffdd"
| 56 || May 16 || at Florida || No. 12 || Alfred A. McKethan Stadium • Gainesville, Florida || W 11–8 || 42–14 || 21–9
|-

|-
! style="" | Postseason: 11–2
|- valign="top"

|- align="center" bgcolor="#ddffdd"
| 57 || May 19 || vs. (7) Ole Miss || (2) No. 10 || Hoover Metropolitan Stadium • Hoover, Alabama || W 7–6 || 43–14 || 1–0
|- align="center" bgcolor="#ddffdd"
| 58 || May 20 || vs. (6) Mississippi State || (2) No. 10 || Hoover Metropolitan Stadium • Hoover, Alabama || W 4–3 || 44–14 || 2–0
|- align="center" bgcolor="#ddffdd"
| 59 || May 22 || vs. (6) Mississippi State || (2) No. 10 || Hoover Metropolitan Stadium • Hoover, Alabama || W 12–11 || 45–14 || 3–0
|- align="center" bgcolor="#ddffdd"
| 60 || May 23 || vs. (4) No. 8 Arkansas || (2) No. 10 || Hoover Metropolitan Stadium • Hoover, Alabama || W 9–3 || 46–14 || 4–0
|-

|- align="center" bgcolor="#ddffdd"
| 61 || May 28 || (4)  || (1) No. 9 || Sewell–Thomas Stadium • Tuscaloosa, Alabama || W 16–3 || 47–14 || 1–0
|- align="center" bgcolor="#ddffdd"
| 62 || May 29 || (3)  || (1) No. 9 || Sewell–Thomas Stadium • Tuscaloosa, Alabama || W 10–4 || 48–14 || 2–0
|- align="center" bgcolor="#ddffdd"
| 63 || May 30 || (3) Southern Miss || (1) No. 9 || Sewell–Thomas Stadium • Tuscaloosa, Alabama || W 7–6 || 49–14 || 3–0
|-

|- align="center" bgcolor="#ddffdd"
| 64 || June 4 || No. 13 LSU || (5) No. 7 || Sewell–Thomas Stadium • Tuscaloosa, Alabama || W 13–6 || 50–14 || 4–0
|- align="center" bgcolor="#ddffdd"
| 65 || June 5 || No. 13 LSU || (5) No. 7 || Sewell–Thomas Stadium • Tuscaloosa, Alabama || W 13–5 || 51–14 || 5–0
|-

|- align="center" bgcolor="#ddffdd"
| 66 || June 11 || vs. No. 8 Oklahoma State || (5) No. 7 || Johnny Rosenblatt Stadium • Omaha, Nebraska || W 11–3 || 52–14 || 1–0
|- align="center" bgcolor="#ffdddd"
| 67 || June 13 || vs. (1) No. 1 Miami (FL) || (5) No. 7 || Johnny Rosenblatt Stadium • Omaha, Nebraska || L 1–8 || 52–15 || 1–1
|- align="center" bgcolor="#ddffdd"
| 68 || June 16 || vs. (8) No. 2  || (5) No. 7 || Johnny Rosenblatt Stadium • Omaha, Nebraska || W 6–5 || 53–15 || 2–1
|- align="center" bgcolor="#ffdddd"
| 69 || June 17 || vs. (1) No. 1 Miami (FL) || (5) No. 7 || Johnny Rosenblatt Stadium • Omaha, Nebraska || L 2–5 || 53–16 || 2–2
|-

Awards and honors 
Antonio Bostic
 Tuscaloosa Regional All-Tournament Team

Sam Bozanich
 Tuscaloosa Regional All-Tournament Team

Jeremy Brown
 SEC All-Tournament Team
 BA Freshman All-American Second Team
 CB Freshman All-American Second Team

Lance Cormier
 CB Freshman All-American First Team
 BW Freshman All-American First Team

Kelley Gulledge
 SEC All-Tournament Team
 Tuscaloosa Regional All-Tournament Team

G. W. Keller
 ABCA All-South Region Team
 First Team All-SEC
 SEC All-Tournament Team
 College World Series All-Tournament Team

Andy Phillips
 ABCA All-South Region Team
 First Team All-SEC
 Tuscaloosa Regional All-Tournament Team
 Tuscaloosa Regional MVP
 NCBWA District III Player of the Year
 Dick Howser Trophy Finalist
 First Team All-American

Manny Torres
 ABCA All-South Region Team
 Second Team All-SEC

References 

Alabama
Alabama Crimson Tide baseball seasons
Alabama Crimson Tide baseball
College World Series seasons
Alabama